Jennifer McKenzie (born 1962) is a Canadian politician and former leader of the New Brunswick New Democratic Party. She was acclaimed as leader on August 10, 2017. On February 25, 2019, a day after losing a leadership review on whether or not a new leadership election should be held within six months, she resigned as leader rather than run as a leadership candidate.

McKenzie had previously served as chair of the Ottawa-Carleton District School Board for two terms.

She is an engineer by training and a tech entrepreneur who formerly served as vice-president of Instantel Inc, a technology manufacturer. McKenzie was born in Fredericton, New Brunswick and moved to Ontario to pursue her career before returning to New Brunswick. She lives in Saint John, New Brunswick. McKenzie has three adult children.

McKenzie was a candidate for the New Democratic Party in Fundy Royal for the 2015 federal election placing third with 18% of the vote. Previously, she was also a candidate for the Ontario New Democratic Party in Ottawa Centre in the 2014 Ontario provincial election finishing second with 20% of the vote.

McKenzie led the NDP during the 2018 provincial election. The party failed to win any seats and McKenzie ran third in her district of Saint John Harbour.

Electoral record

References

New Brunswick New Democratic Party leaders
Living people
1962 births
Politicians from Fredericton
Canadian women engineers
Female Canadian political party leaders
Women in New Brunswick politics
Ontario school board trustees
New Brunswick candidates for Member of Parliament
Ontario New Democratic Party candidates in Ontario provincial elections
21st-century women engineers